Guy Winston Salmon  (born 1949) is a New Zealand environmentalist.

Salmon was born in 1949; his father was John Salmon. He is executive director of the Ecologic Foundation, an independent policy think tank. He has been involved with this organisation in its various forms since the 1970s. In the early 1970s, Salmon was a prominent member of the environmentalist Values Party.

In 1990 and 1991, Salmon was a member of Simon Upton's review group that finalised the definition of sustainable management included in the Resource Management Act 1991.

He stood as a candidate for Parliament on behalf of the Progressive Greens in 1996 and the New Zealand National Party in the 2002 election.

Salmon is the son of John Tenison Salmon, who was a noted entomologist and professor of zoology at Victoria University of Wellington, and Pamela Naomi Salmon (née Wilton). In 1990, he was awarded the New Zealand 1990 Commemoration Medal.

In the 2021 New Year Honours, Salmon was appointed an Officer of the New Zealand Order of Merit, for services to the environment.

References

1949 births
Living people
New Zealand environmentalists
New Zealand activists
Values Party politicians
New Zealand National Party politicians
Unsuccessful candidates in the 1996 New Zealand general election
Unsuccessful candidates in the 2002 New Zealand general election
Officers of the New Zealand Order of Merit